Satyrium carneum is a species of orchid endemic to southwestern Western Cape. It is also known by the names pink satyr orchid, rooikappie, or rooitrewwa.

Description 
It is a robust terrestrial that grows from 370mm to 710mm tall. Leaves are 2 to 4, thick and fleshy; the lower 2 are partly pressed onto the ground, 70mm to 230mm long, with gradual transition to the sheaths higher up.

Distribution 
Satyrium carneum is found from the Cape Peninsula to Riversdale and Sedgefield. It is becoming increasingly local and rare.

Habitat 
Satyrium carneum is found in dune bush vegetation, in fynbos on coastal hills and on ridges, on moist to dry sands and limestone, at altitudes of 10-300 m.

Conservation status 
Satyrium carneum is classified as Least Concern, as it is a common species that is declining across its range, but not yet in danger of extinction. Recent observations indicate that it still persists in at least 25 locations. It faces threats of habitat loss; it has lost 22% of its habitat to urban expansion on the Cape Peninsula and Cape Flats, and coastal development between Betty's Bay and Gansbaai. It is also threatened by competition from dense infestations of alien invasive plants across its range.

References 

carneum
Endemic orchids of South Africa